Mardyck (Dutch: Mardijk) is a former commune in the Nord department in northern France. It is an associated commune with Dunkirk since it joined the latter in January 1980.

Heraldry
The arms of Mardyck are blazoned: Azure, standing in a boat Or, St. Nicolas vested argent and Or, with mitre and crozier Or, with 3 children at his feet.

See also
 Communes of the Nord department
 Fort-Mardyck

References

Dunkirk
Former communes of Nord (French department)